Matthew Holmes (born 17 July 1976 in Albury, New South Wales, Australia) is an Australian actor.

Education
Holmes attended Newington College (1981–1993). He gained an Advanced Diploma in Acting at the Actors College of Theatre and Television.

Career
Holmes was one of the main characters in Sea Patrol's 2007–2011 seasons. His character is Petty Officer Chris Blake, the Coxswain of a fictional Royal Australian Navy Patrol Boat. He made his first appearance in the first season (2007), and remained on the show until its series end. He appeared in twenty-one episodes, with the finale being broadcast in June 2011.

He appeared as Constable Matthew "Matt" Graham on the Seven Network Australian police drama series Blue Heelers.

Holmes is also recognised for appearing in two television ads – one for the website seek.com.au and the other for the Victoria and Queensland Government's Drink-Driving campaign. He also appears in the Working Like a Machine? Kit Kat ad.

References

External links

"Seek and You Will Find – seek.com.au" Advertisement Video
"Only A Little Bit – QLD. Government Drink-Driving Campaign" Advertisement Video
"Holmes Wields The Willow" – a pilot episode for a new miniseries on the life and times of Jim Higgs (one of Australia's leading post war test batsman)

1976 births
Living people
Australian male television actors
Australian male stage actors
Male actors from Sydney
People educated at Newington College
People from Albury, New South Wales